Getting By is an American sitcom that aired on ABC from March 5, 1993, until May 21, 1993, and on NBC from September 21, 1993, until June 18, 1994. The series was created by William Bickley and Michael Warren, who also served as executive producers with Thomas L. Miller and Robert L. Boyett. The final Miller-Boyett series to begin its run under parent studio Lorimar Television, Getting By was folded into Warner Bros. Television for its second season, following Warner Bros.' absorption of Lorimar.

The series was a part of ABC's TGIF lineup in its first season before switching to NBC for the second and final season.

Synopsis
The show was about two best friends and single mothers, one white and one black, who decide to split the mortgage on a new home in suburban Oak Park, Illinois and live there with their respective families. The women, widowed Dolores Dixon (Telma Hopkins) and Cathy Hale (Cindy Williams), whose husband ran off with another woman, were also co-workers, as they were employed as social workers for the Chicago Department of Social Services. Dolores had two sons, Marcus (Merlin Santana) and Darren (Deon Richmond). Cathy had two daughters, Nikki (Nicki Vannice) and Julie (Ashleigh Blair Sterling).

Episodes

Season 1 (1993)

Season 2 (1993–1994)

Awards and nominations

External links

1993 American television series debuts
1994 American television series endings
American Broadcasting Company original programming
English-language television shows
NBC original programming
Television series by Warner Bros. Television Studios
TGIF (TV programming block)
American television series revived after cancellation
Television shows set in Cook County, Illinois
1990s American black sitcoms